The 2018 American Athletic Conference baseball tournament was scheduled to be held at Spectrum Field in Clearwater, Florida, from May 22 through 26. Anticipated weather forced a truncated schedule causing the event to be condensed, and the title game was played on May 25. The event, held at the end of the conference regular season, determines the champion of the American Athletic Conference for the 2018 season. East Carolina won the double-elimination tournament and received the conference's automatic bid to the 2018 NCAA Division I baseball tournament.

Format and seeding
The top eight baseball teams in The American were seeded based on their records in conference play.  The tournament used a two-bracket double-elimination format, which led to a single championship game between the winners of each bracket.

Bracket

All-Tournament Team
The following players were named to the All-Tournament Team.

Most Outstanding Player
Spencer Brickhouse, East Carolina

References

Tournament
American Athletic Conference Baseball Tournament
Baseball competitions in Florida
American Athletic Conference baseball tournament
American Athletic Conference baseball tournament
College sports tournaments in Florida